Leo Catozzo (10 December 1912 – 4 March 1997) was an Italian award-winning film editor. He was often credited as Leo Cattozzo. He is best known as the designer and manufacturer of the self-perforating adhesive tape film splicer known as CIR-Catozzo.

Life and career 
Born in Adria, Province of Rovigo, the son of the musician Nino, Catozzo graduated in law, then in cello at the  Benedetto Marcello Conservatory in Venice, and finally  in set design and directing at the Centro Sperimentale di Cinematografia in Rome. He entered the film industry in the early 1940s as a screenwriter and later assistant director for several Mario Mattoli's comedy films. 

Catozzo debuted as a film editor in 1951 for Mattoli's My Heart Sings, and later worked with Alberto Lattuada, Mario Soldati and especially Federico Fellini whose films he edited during the fifties and sixties, most notably La Dolce Vita and 8½. 8½ was listed as the 41st best-edited film of all time in a 2012 survey of members of the Motion Picture Editors Guild. In 1956 Catozzo received the American Cinema Editors Award for King Vidor's War and Peace. 

Being allergic to acetone, Catozzo projected and developed an innovative film splicer, later known as "CIR-Catozzo", "Pressa Catozzo" or just "Catozzo", using it for the first time in Fellini's Nights of Cabiria. The insistent demands of his colleagues forced him first to fabricate a hundred copies and later, to patent the machine which launched, in the early sixties, the mass production of the film splicer, something that gradually drew him away from his activity as an editor. In 1989 he received the Academy Scientific and Technical Award for his creation.

Selected filmography
 A Little Wife (1943)
 Anything for a Song (1943)
 Toto Seeks Peace (1954)
 Nights of Cabiria (1959) - also as actor
 8½ (1963).

References

External links 

 

1912 births
1997 deaths
Italian film editors
People from the Province of Rovigo
Centro Sperimentale di Cinematografia alumni
People from Adria
20th-century Italian screenwriters
Academy Award for Technical Achievement winners
Italian male screenwriters
20th-century Italian male writers